WZZM (channel 13) is a television station licensed to Grand Rapids, Michigan, United States, serving West Michigan as an affiliate of ABC. Owned by Tegna Inc., the station has studios on 3 Mile Road NW in Walker (with a Grand Rapids mailing address), and its transmitter is located in Grant, Michigan.

Channel 13 was inserted into Grand Rapids in 1961; station spacing rules of the time required that the transmitter be to the north of the city, closer to Muskegon. The station went on the air in November 1962 under interim operating authority; four companies jointly owned the station until West Michigan Telecasters was granted the permanent license in 1964 and bought out the others' interim holdings in 1965. Because of the transmitter site restriction, the station did not and does not provide a signal to the southern part of West Michigan, namely Kalamazoo and Battle Creek. In the late 1960s and early 1970s, the station's efforts to build additional transmitters to serve those cities were ordered closed to protect a new station on channel 41 in Battle Creek, WUHQ-TV (now WOTV), which also broadcasts ABC but with separate non-network programming. An attempt to combine WZZM-TV and WUHQ-TV failed in 1991, and WOTV is today co-owned with WOOD-TV, the market's NBC affiliate. Satellite television providers Dish Network and DirecTV provide both stations across the entire market, and WZZM is also on cable in Battle Creek.

In local news, the station had a highly regarded news department from the 1960s through the 1980s; it had one news director for the first 25 years of its history. While the station continues to be competitive particularly in the Grand Rapids area, coverage shortfalls and the aggregate nature of the television market have given the overall edge to WOOD-TV since the 1990s. The station maintains a lit weather ball displayed near its Walker studios.

History

Assignment of channel 13 to Grand Rapids; construction

In 1959, the Atlas Broadcasting Company was organized to pursue the addition of a third very high frequency (VHF) station in West Michigan. It applied to the Federal Communications Commission (FCC) proposing the addition of channel 13 to Grand Rapids. The station would transmit from an area near Muskegon, north of Grand Rapids, where it would be appropriately spaced to channel 13 stations in Toledo, Ohio, and Rockford, Illinois. Atlas also proposed moving WWTV in Cadillac to channel 9, where it would still be appropriately spaced to the channel 9 station in Windsor, Ontario. The FCC approved this allocation change in 1961; it replaced channel 9 in Alpena with channel 6. The placement of the channel at Grand Rapids attracted interest even before the insertion was final. By the end of 1960, three groups had incorporated with an eye toward filing for channel 13, including West Michigan Telecasters, consisting of 24 shareholders and presided by Lewis V. Chamberlain, Jr., whose final application was filed in October 1961. One of the shareholders was L. William Seidman, then on the board of directors of Grand Valley State College and later chairman of the Federal Deposit Insurance Corporation. Some of the stockholders were from Muskegon; the group promoted the northerly transmitter site as a bonus, noting that there were no local stations in Muskegon and that other communities such as Grand Haven and Holland also were underserved. West Michigan was one of six applicants to file by the end of 1961, alongside Atlas (which also owned Grand Rapids-area radio station WMAX); Grand Broadcasting Company, which counted former WLAV and WLAV-TV owner Leonard Versluis among its stockholders as well as former FCC counsel Mary Jane Morris; Major Television Company; MKO Broadcasting Company; and Peninsular Broadcasting Company. 

In its order assigning channel 13 to Grand Rapids, the FCC indicated its willingness to accept proposals for interim operating authority to hasten the construction of the station. This meant that the comparative hearing process would run in parallel with construction of the station. Days after filing its permanent bid, West Michigan Telecasters also proposed interim operating authority. Major and Atlas both withdrew in August 1962; the four remaining contenders formed Channel 13, Grand Rapids, Inc., which received interim authority that same month. The interim station originally chose the call letters WIIM-TV, but WJIM-TV in Lansing objected, resulting in the choice of WZZM as the call sign. Construction rapidly proceeded, and from studios in the Pantlind Hotel downtown, WZZM made its first broadcast on November 1, 1962, an ABC affiliate from the start.

While WZZM was on the air, the applicants wrangled at the FCC over permanent authority to run it. In May 1963, an FCC hearing examiner gave Grand Broadcasting Company the nod in his initial decision, citing its superior integration of ownership and management, a comparative criterion analyzing the involvement of owners in station operations. The FCC itself, however, instead selected West Michigan Telecasters in April 1964, citing its principals' involvement in civic affairs and research into local public service programming. The company then settled with the other applicants, ultimately paying them between $360,000 and $390,000 apiece, and on January 25, 1965, it became the sole owner of WZZM. After the award, West Michigan Telecasters proceeded with its plans to build a studio in Muskegon.

After a plan to merge with Basic Communications Inc. and Eccentric magazine in Birmingham, Michigan, fell through, West Michigan Telecasters merged with two publishing companies in 1969 to form Synercom Communications Corporation. In 1971, WZZM-TV finally left the Pantlind and moved to purpose-built studios. The  facility also housed WZZM-FM, which West Michigan Telecasters had acquired in 1966, and the station's production arm. Synercom then spun West Michigan Telecasters and the WZZM stations out as its own company in 1973, including Elinor Bunin Productions, a New York City film production house.

Wometco and Price ownership
West Michigan Telecasters entered into an agreement to sell WZZM-TV to Wometco Enterprises for $14 million in 1976, with WZZM-TV becoming Wometco's fourth television property. The acquisition closed in January 1978; WZZM-FM was split from the television station by West Michigan Telecasters and sold to separate interests. Wometco was then taken private in a leveraged buyout by Kohlberg Kravis Roberts (KKR) in 1984.

KKR then sold the station to Price Communications, owned by Robert Price, in 1985; the deal was the largest acquisition for the company to date. Price then sold its four stations to Northstar Television Group in 1989 for $70 million; Northstar was a joint venture of Osborn Television and Desai Capital, the largest stakeholder in Price. Three of Northstar's four stations were acquired by Argyle Television Holdings II in 1994; the original Argyle Television had been sold earlier in the year.

Gannett/Tegna ownership
In 1996, the Gannett Company acquired Multimedia, Inc.. This created conflicts for the company in Cincinnati and Oklahoma City, where Multimedia had a newspaper-TV station combination and a TV station-cable system combination that were not permissible under FCC rules of the time. As a result, Gannett agreed to a trade with Argyle. Gannett sent Argyle the Cincinnati and Oklahoma City stations (WLWT and KOCO-TV) in exchange for $20 million; WGRZ in Buffalo, New York; and WZZM-TV. In 1999, after a 33-year run, the station ceased producing its local children's show, Bozo's Big Top.

From 1967 to 1987, a weather ball sat atop the Michigan National Bank building in Grand Rapids, utilizing 288 colored neon lights to convey forecast precipitation or changes in temperature, until being removed because its weight had caused structural damage. The station located the stainless steel ball in a scrapyard in Kalamazoo in 1999 and applied to authorities in Walker to mount a  pole to display it near its studios in 2002. New neon tubes were fitted atop the restored weather ball, which returned to service in 2003.

On June 29, 2015, the Gannett Company split in two, with one side specializing in print media and the other side specializing in broadcast and digital media. WZZM was retained by the latter company, named Tegna.

The Battle Creek–Kalamazoo problem

The northerly location of the transmitter, which had been necessary to insert channel 13 in the area in the first place, also put it at a disadvantage in the Kalamazoo and Battle Creek areas. In 1964, WZZM was authorized to construct a translator on channel 12 in Kalamazoo, and the next year, it applied to build one on channel 83 in Battle Creek. This was simultaneous with Mary Jane Morris, who had been involved with one of the losing bids for channel 13, filing with James Searer to build a full-service station there. That translator went on the air on channel 74 in January 1968, but the FCC then ordered it to cease broadcasting in early March in the context of a battle with the permittee for Battle Creek's channel 41, as the commission expressed concern that the continued rebroadcast of WZZM-TV could be detrimental to the establishment of the proposed full-service station. This was particularly acute because the channel 41 permittee, BCU-TV, proposed to affiliate with ABC, while WZZM-TV contended it had the rights to ABC in the Battle Creek area. West Michigan Telecasters reached a deal with BCU-TV to buy the channel 41 permit in October 1968.

However, that same week, a second local group, Channel 41, Inc., filed a competing application to propose a local station, with Searer defecting from BCU-TV to become one of its leaders. The FCC canceled BCU-TV's construction permit and West Michigan Telecasters's attempt to buy it on September 8, 1969. It then accepted the application of Channel 41, Inc., for filing; ten days later, West Michigan Telecasters abandoned its attempt to pursue channel 41 in favor of seeking a relocation of its transmitter from Grant to Hudsonville, improving the signal in Kalamazoo and Battle Creek. However, the spacing considerations that resulted in the northerly location of WZZM in the first place were an insurmountable obstacle; the FCC denied the proposal because it would have been too close to the channel 13 station in Toledo.

Channel 41, Inc., received its construction permit in July 1970 and went on the air as WUHQ-TV on July 24, 1971. The Battle Creek cable system removed WZZM-TV from its lineup to accommodate the new ABC affiliate; in spite of the competition, WUHQ-TV depended on WZZM to receive ABC network programming. The FCC then ordered WZZM-TV to cease using its Kalamazoo translator on February 7, 1972. WZZM-TV was restored to Battle Creek cable in 1975 over objections from WUHQ-TV, then discontinued in 1986 along with two out-of-market network affiliates.

In 1990, WZZM owner Northstar Television announced it had entered into a merger agreement with Channel 41, Inc., the owner of WUHQ-TV, which would have seen WUHQ-TV and WZZM share almost all programming with the exception of split local news programming. John Lawrence, president of WUHQ, said at the time, "It is now appropriate that ABC service in this market be combined." The FCC approved of the merger in June 1991, with Northstar announcing a plan to continue airing separate news coverage, but a planned August closing was delayed and never took place. WUHQ-TV's owners then signed an agreement for WOTV (channel 8) to provide news coverage for channel 41, part of an 11-year time brokerage agreement by which WOTV assumed many of the station's operating functions but not ownership. WUHQ-TV then changed its call sign to WOTV in June 1992 when WOTV became WOOD-TV.

Dish Network began offering local channel service in the market in 2002 and offers WZZM and WOTV in all areas. WZZM was readded to several Comcast systems in southwest Michigan, including Battle Creek, in 2009.

News operation

WZZM had one news director for the first 25 years of its history. Jack Hogan—who was the first voice heard on the station when it started—remained the news director until Price Communications owner Robert Price fired him in February 1988. During Hogan's tenure, the station was a stop on the careers of journalists including sportcaster John Keating (known as Steve Knight in Grand Rapids), future Detroit Free Press executive editor Kurt Luedtke, and reporters Jay Schadler and Martha Teichner. In addition to being the news and revenue leader in West Michigan in spite of its coverage shortfalls, it was nationally respected: the Associated Press said in 1980 that "WZZM has a quality news operation that should be the envy of many stations in larger markets", while it won six straight "News Station of the Year" honors within Michigan from United Press International. However, after the Price purchase, the station experienced several high-profile defections to other stations. The firing came less than two weeks after the 1988 Michigan Republican presidential caucus. Price, a Republican, demanded information on delegate counts; from New York City, he ordered Hogan out of bed and to station offices to keep him informed until 3 a.m., accused the station's staff of poor reporting despite not having seen its coverage, and threatened to fire the entire news department.

The 1990s brought changes in the newsroom. The station debuted an hour-long morning news program in 1992 and a 5:30 p.m. newscast in February 1993. However, WOOD-TV became the news leader in the highly fragmented market: though WZZM-TV was stronger within the immediate Grand Rapids area, WOOD's availability in the Kalamazoo–Battle Creek area more than offset the Muskegon and northern area coverage unique to channel 13. WOOD-TV's sales manager likened the advertising sales power of his competitor to "a vehicle with two wheels" because of its inability to cover the full market. Another obstacle, particularly with older viewers, was that WOOD-TV predated WZZM in Grand Rapids by more than a decade. In 2016, WZZM added eight and a half hours a week of new newscasts, including morning and noon news extensions and a 5 p.m. newscast.

In 2004, the station debuted a 5 p.m. talk show, Take Five Grand Rapids. The program was originally produced outside the news department, mixing features and sponsored segments. The show was moved to 4:30 p.m., retitled Take Five & Company, and then moved to an hour at 9 a.m. in 2008. It was replaced with a new hour-long program known as My West Michigan in 2015. The program was put on a continuing hiatus in July 2020 because of COVID-19-related restrictions that made the show's format unworkable.

Technical information

Subchannels
The station's digital signal is multiplexed:

Analog-to-digital conversion
WZZM shut down its analog signal, over VHF channel 13, on June 12, 2009, as part of the federally mandated transition from analog to digital television. The station's digital signal relocated from its pre-transition UHF channel 39 to channel 13.

References

External links
 

ABC network affiliates
True Crime Network affiliates
Quest (American TV network) affiliates
Twist (TV network) affiliates
This TV affiliates
Start TV affiliates
Tegna Inc.
Television channels and stations established in 1962
1962 establishments in Michigan
ZZM
Local AccuWeather Channel affiliates
Wometco Enterprises
Former Gannett subsidiaries